The Clubman and the Tramp is a 1908 American silent short comedy film directed by D. W. Griffith.

Cast
 Florence Lawrence as Bridget / Dinner Guest
 Linda Arvidson as Dinner Guest
 John R. Cumpson
 George Gebhardt as Waiter
 Robert Harron as Man on Street
 Arthur V. Johnson as Dinner Guest / Moneylender
 Jeanie MacPherson as Dinner Guest
 Mack Sennett as Dinner Guest / Policeman
 Harry Solter as Man on Street

References

External links
 

1908 films
1908 comedy films
Silent American comedy films
American silent short films
American black-and-white films
Films directed by D. W. Griffith
1908 short films
American comedy short films
1900s American films